Erick Ochieng (born 5 May 1987) is a British professional boxer in the Welterweight division and former BBBofC English super-welterweight champion.

Ochieng was born in Kaloleni, Nairobi, Kenya. He was raised by his grandmother, and following her death, he moved to London aged 11 to join his parents, who had moved to London earlier. Ochieng has fought 65 amateur fights altogether with a record of 55–10.

Professional career
On 23 June 2006 Ochieng beat the British veteran Matt Scriven to win his pro debut. On 18 March 2011 he fought against Luke Robinson - amateur ABA runner-up in 2008. Robinson won by unanimous decision.

On 28 January 2012 Ochieng won against British boxer Nick Quigley and received a first professional belt in his career - BBBofC English in super-welterweight division.

In the last fight (2017) Erick lost the match against Freddy Kiwitt with a score 11:1:0

References

External links

1987 births
Light-middleweight boxers
Welterweight boxers
Living people
British male boxers
Sportspeople from Nairobi